Heterolocha arizana is a moth in the family Geometridae. It is found in Taiwan.

References

Moths described in 1910
Ourapterygini
Moths of Taiwan